The hornyhead chub (Nocomis biguttatus) is a small species of minnow in the family Cyprinidae of order Cypriniformes. It mainly inhabits small rivers and streams of the northern central USA, up into Canada. The adults inhabit faster, rocky pools of rivers.

Range
The hornyhead chub ranges from Wyoming, North Dakota, and South Dakota, east to the Hudson River drainage and south to Oklahoma. In South Dakota, the hornyhead chub is at the western edge of its range. Hornyhead chubs have been found in several water bodies in the Minnesota River Basin including the north and south forks of the Yellowbank River, Monigan Creek, Cobb Creek, Whetstone Creek, the North Fork of Whetstone Creek and Gary Creek in Roberts, Grant and Deuel Counties, as well as in Big Stone Lake in Grant County. In 1952, hornyhead chubs were documented to occur in the Big Sioux River drainage, but the exact location is unknown. The hornyhead chub has not been documented in the Big Sioux River drainage since the finding in 1952, and is likely extirpated from this watershed. They are also found in the Mississippi River basin, Red River drainage, Ohio River and lower Kentucky River systems. They can be found from New York west into the Dakotas with isolated populations in the Platte and Colorado River Systems, and north from Manitoba and south into Kentucky. There are hornyhead chubs in Georgia below Chattahoochee Forest National Fish Hatchery on Rock Creek and Toccoa River in Suches,GA.

Description
The Hornyhead chub is moderate in size and slightly subterminal with an inconspicuous barbel in corner of mouth. This fish has no teeth. A body pattern of a back olive brown in color, with its sides having silvery color, and a belly of white. It also has a dark lateral stripe and a spot at the base of the tail, which is faint or absent in some adults. Fins contain decorative markings. Its body shape is fusiform and robust, round in cross-section. Typical adult size is 100–150 mm TL (4–6 in), with a maximum of about 225 mm (9 in). It has a forked tail and a single relatively short dorsal fin with 8 rays and without spines. Its pelvic fins are abdominal and has no adipose fin. Lastly, its anal fin with 7 rays has no spines. Its distinguishing characteristics are its moderately slightly subterminal mouth, and its defining inconspicuous barbel in the corner of its mouth. It also uniquely has 38-48 lateral line scales and a dark lateral stripe and caudal spot.  Breeding adults have numerous large pointed tubercles on the top of their heads, smaller tubercles on their pectoral fins and a red or orange spot on the upper opercle behind their eyes. However juveniles look similar to adults, but have more obvious lateral stripes and caudal spots, and their tails are typically more reddish than the adult's tail. Adults can grow to 11 cm or more, and males commonly grow tubercles on their head during spawning season.

Habitat
The hornyhead chub is found in rocky pools and runs of creeks and small to medium-sized rivers.  The hornyhead chub inhabits riffle/pool sections of small streams to medium-sized rivers. Although they are occasionally found in dark-water streams, they are more commonly found in clear-water streams. Presence is inversely related to turbidity. Vegetation does not necessarily have an effect on abundance of adults, however, the young use vegetation extensively for cover and are found in higher concentrations in these areas, at least for the first several weeks to one month of life. This species is commonly found in water depths
of 2 – 6 feet (60 – 181 cm).

Life history and reproduction
Hornyhead chubs spawn from May through June. They become sexually mature at 2 to 3 years of age.  Males build a cup shaped depression that they build up with pebbles that can be as large as 1–3 feet across and 6-8 inches high.  Eggs and sperm are deposited in depressions in the nests and covered with gravel.  Males defend the nest mounds from other N. biguttatus males but not other species.  Other species take advantage of this defense and spawn in the nest mounds. The result of this is sometimes accidental hybridization. The same male may spawn with several females.

Diet
The hornyhead chub is a visual feeder that is active primarily during daylight. A variety of plant and animal food items are commonly reported for hornyhead chubs. Animal food items for the young include: rotifers, cladocerans, copepods, chironomids, and aquatic insect larvae. Older hornyhead chubs are known to consume: clams, snails, crayfish, worms, aquatic insect larvae, and fish.

Importance to humans
Due to the fact that smallmouth bass, northern pike, and rock bass are thought to prey on the hornyhead chub, this type of minnow is often used as bait during fishing expeditions.

Conservation status
Globally, the status of the hornyhead chub is secure, but it is considered Critically Imperiled in Wyoming, Kansas, and Pennsylvania, and Possibly or Presumed Extirpated in Colorado and Nebraska. Currently, the National Heritage Program has assigned the hornyhead chub a global ranking of G5 suggesting that the species’ existence is globally secure and of least concern (LC).

Etymology of name
Etymology: Nocomis: An indigenous (North America) name used by Charles Girard; ojibwe, nokomiss = grandmother. Actinopterygii (ray-finned fishes) > Cypriniformes (Carps) > Cyprinidae (Minnows or carps) > Leuciscinae.

Notes

References

"Hornyhead Chub | Fish." Encyclopædia Britannica Online. Encyclopædia Britannica, n.d. Web. 4 May 2015.
Article title
"HORNYHEAD CHUB." SD GFP. N.p., n.d. Web. 3 May 2015.
"Fish Details." Fish Details. University of Wisconsin Sea Grant Institute, n.d. Web. 2 May 2015.
Gundersen, Jeff, Paul Tucker, and Richards Carl. "Aquaculture Potential for Hornyhead (Redtail) Chubs " Oecologia 175.1 (2014): 325–34. 2008. Web.
Report on the Status of the Hornyhead Chub Nocomis Biguttatus in Canada. Ottawa: Committee on the Status of Endangered Wildlife in Canada, 1988. Web.
"Hornyhead Chub." Fishes of Boneyard Creek. N.p., n.d. Web. 5 May 2015.

Chubs (fish)
Nocomis
Fish of Canada
Freshwater fish of the United States
Taxa named by Jared Potter Kirtland
Fish described in 1840